McCurdy Log House is an historic home located near Concord, Cabarrus County, North Carolina. It was built about 1773, and is a one-story, double-pen log house.  It was built by Archibald McCurdy, a farmer and tradesman and officer in the Continental Line.

It was listed on the National Register of Historic Places in 1974.

References

Log houses in the United States
Houses on the National Register of Historic Places in North Carolina
Houses completed in 1773
Houses in Cabarrus County, North Carolina
National Register of Historic Places in Cabarrus County, North Carolina
Log buildings and structures on the National Register of Historic Places in North Carolina